Ralph John Lattimore (born 23 June 1967) is a New Zealand basketball player. He competed in the men's tournament at the 2000 Summer Olympics.

Career
Latimore began his career with the Canterbury Rams, later representing the Nelson Giants and Auckland Stars, winning 5 titles in 6 years with Auckland.

References

External links
 

1967 births
Living people
New Zealand men's basketball players
Olympic basketball players of New Zealand
Basketball players at the 2000 Summer Olympics
Sportspeople from Christchurch